In Philippine folk tradition, Rajah Salalila (Baybayin: , Sanskrit: शरीर, syarirah) was the Rajah or paramount ruler of the early Indianized Philippine settlement of Maynila, and the father of the individual named Ache, who would eventually be well known as Rajah Matanda. Based on perceived similarities between the names, he is sometimes also called Sulaiman I (Abecedario: Súláiman, from Arabic: sulaiman سليمان) in the belief that he shared the name of his supposed grandson, Rajah Sulayman.

Oral traditions cited by Odal-Devora (2000) identify him as a son of the legendary Dayang Kalangitan and Rajah Lontok. Genealogical traditions cited by Majul (1973) claim that he converted to Islam from indigenous Tagalog beliefs as a result of the missionary efforts of the Sultanate of Brunei.

Salalila's rule ended when he died some time in the early 1500s, and he was succeeded by his wife, who was not named in historical accounts. By 1570, his son Ache had succeeded to the position himself, and had come to be known as "Rajah Matanda" (lit. "Old Rajah").

Sources 
Little is known for sure about Salalila due to the lack of firsthand documentary sources covering the timeframe of his life and reign. The little that is known for certain by scholars comes from the account given by his son "Prince" Ache to Sebastian Elcano and the other surviving members of the Magellan expedition in 1521. Some additional details can be gleaned from extant genealogical sources, such as the "Lakandula documents" deposited at the Philippine National Archives but these accounts are often conflicting and present conflicts interest. As a result, the factuality and accuracy of the details presented in these documents requires careful assessment by historiographers.

Name

Identification in historical documents as "Salalila"
The records of Ache's 1521 account before the crew of Sebastian Elcano's expedition did not identify Salalila by name. However, he is referred to using the name "Salalila" in the "Lakandula documents" deposited at the Philippine National Archives, as well as by apocryphal sources, such as the alleged 1539 "Will of Pansomun".

Sulaiman theory
His supposed identification as "Sulaiman I" was presented as a theory in the 1950s, based on the similarities of "Salalila" and "Suleiman". However, this identification is the subject of debate among present-day historiographers.

Known relations

Historically documented relations 
A number of Salalila's relations are documented in Ache (Rajah Matanda)'s 1521 account. This includes:
 Ache (Rajah Matanda), Salalila's son – Self-acknowledged to be Salalila's son
 Salalila's widow, Ache's mother – Not specifically named in the 1521 accounts of Aganduru Moriz, Gines de Mafra or Antonio Pigaffetta, but sometimes named "Dayang Ysmeria" in 20th century folk traditions.
 Ache's "cousin", the ruler of Tondo – Presumably also related to Salalila, this cousin is believed to be roughly Ache's age, but had already become Lakan of Tondo by 1521, when he was allegedly encroaching on the territory of Maynila, then ruled by Ache's mother. It is not known if "cousin" is a precise term, or a general term meaning a "relative".
 The Sultan of Brunei, Ache's "grandfather" – The 1521 accounts all specify that Ache had run away from Maynila as a young man to seek the political and military support of his grandfather, the Sultan of Brunei, against the Lakan of Tondo. Salalila's exact relationship (by consanguinity or by law) with this Sultan of Brunei is not specified in the extant accounts, and it is not known if "grandfather" is a precise term, or a general term meaning an "ancestor".
 Rajah Sulayman – According to the genealogical research done by Luis Camara Dery, investigating the National Archives' "Lakandula documents" in particular, Ache is believed to have had an unnamed younger brother, who became the father of the Rajah Sulayman, who met De Goiti and Legaspi in 1570–71. Some 20th century traditions name this younger brother Suleiman II, with the Sulayman of the 1570s supposedly being Suleiman III.  However, the provenance of these traditions is unclear.

Other relations as told by Folk traditions 
20th century folk traditions hold Salalila to be a son of Dayang Kalangitan and Rajah Lontok.

Death and succession 
According to Ache's 1521 account, Salalila died while Ache was still very young, and was succeeded by his wife, who was not named in the accounts. By 1570, Salalila's wife had died and Ache had succeeded to Salalila's position himself, and introduced himself as "Rajah Matanda" to the forces of Martin de Goiti (in 1570) and Miguel López de Legazpi (in 1571).

Footnotes

See also
 History of the Philippines (900–1521)
 Bolkiah
 Cainta (historical polity)
 Paramount rulers in early Philippine history
Indian cultural influences in early Philippine polities

References

History of Pasig 

Filipino datus, rajas and sultans
History of the Philippines (900–1565)
Filipino Muslims
Filipino people of Malay descent
16th-century conflicts